Theo Barklem-Biggs (born 21 March 1990) is a British television and film actor from London. He has performed both comedic and dramatic roles.

Career
He made his debut television appearance in The Bill  in 2008. He appeared in EastEnders, Silk, The Fades on British television and then in the 2011 film The Inbetweeners, and the 2014 film Kingsman: The Secret Service.  In May 2020 he began playing Petey in The First Team, playing a young player at a Premier League football club. On the show he appeared with his close friend Samson Kayo with whom he had also appeared in Sliced as two best friends and pizza delivery drivers. Kayo wrote the part specifically for Barklem-Biggs who he had known for 10 or more years.

Barklem-Biggs received praise for his performance as Sid Godley in the 2014 World War One drama Our World War. He had the main role in the BAFTA nominated short-film  Samuel-613.  He appeared in the British TV series Cleaning Up alongside Sheridan Smith and the comedy prison series Crims alongside Elis James.
He also appeared in BBC series Tatau, and the 2018 comedy film The Festival. He was “unsettling” in the 2019 Claire Oakley film
Make Up, and was “effectively creepy” in 2021 British horror film The Power.

2022 saw him star in SAS: Rogue Heroes alongside Connor Swindells, Jack O’Connell, Alfie Allen and Dominic West from Peaky Blinders creator Steven Knight.

Partial filmography

References 

Living people
21st-century English actors
Actors from London
English film actors
English television actors
People from Westminster
1990 births